The rank of field marshal is a five-star rank in the current Libyan military, the Libyan National Army (LNA). General Khalifa Haftar, commander of the LNA since 2 March 2015, was promoted to the rank of field marshal on 14 September 2016 by the decision of the House of Representatives (HoR), a partially recognized legislature located in the city of Tobruk, in the eastern Libyan region of Cyrenaica.

Haftar was promoted in recognition for his leadership in the Operation Surprise Lightning, capturing the four key oil ports (Sidra, Ra's Lanuf, Brega and Zuwetina) in the Gulf of Sirte from the Petroleum Facilities Guard (PFG) during the ongoing Libyan Civil War.

The leading individual of the previous Libyan military, the Armed Forces of the Libyan Arab Jamahiriya, was Brotherly Leader and Guide of the Revolution Muammar Gaddafi, who used the rank of colonel of the Libyan Army.

See also

Libya
Libyan National Army

References

Military of Libya
Libya
Libya
Military ranks